Ein neuer Tag (A New Day) is the second studio album by German band Juli, released on 13 October 2006 via Universal Records. Both a regular and deluxe edition of the album have been released; the latter includes a DVD containing the music video to "Dieses Leben", a road-movie and two making-of documentaries.

Track listing

Personnel 

Eva Briegel – vocals
Greg Calbi – engineer
Peter Hinderthur – arranger
Michael Ilbert – mixing
Sebastian John – trombone
Philipp Kacza – trumpet

Roland Peil – percussion
Jonas Pfetzing – guitar
Marcel Römer – drums
Simon Triebel – guitar
Oli Zülch – engineer

Charts

Weekly charts

Year-end charts

References

External links
 Silbermond.de — official site

2006 albums
Juli (band) albums
German-language albums